The women’s team sprint competition in cross-country skiing at the 2022 Winter Olympics was held on 16 February, at the Kuyangshu Nordic Center and Biathlon Center in Zhangjiakou. Katharina Hennig and Victoria Carl of Germany won the event. Maja Dahlqvist and Jonna Sundling of Sweden won silver medals, and Yuliya Stupak and Natalya Nepryayeva, representing the Russian Olympic Committee, bronze.

Summary
The defending champions are Kikkan Randall and Jessie Diggins. Diggins qualified, Randall has since retired. The silver medalists were Charlotte Kalla and Stina Nilsson. Kalla qualified for the Olympics but didn't participate, and Nilsson switched to biathlon. The 2018 bronze medalists were Marit Bjørgen, who retired from competitions, and Maiken Caspersen Falla, who qualified. The overall leader of the 2021–22 FIS Cross-Country World Cup before the Olympics was Natalya Nepryayeva, and the sprint leader was Maja Dahlqvist. Jonna Sundling and Dahlqvist won the only team sprint event of the season. They are also the 2021 World Champions in team sprint and previously finished 1–2 in the individual sprint at the 2022 Olympics.

In the final, five teams, Sweden, Finland, Germany, the United States, and the Russian Olympic Committee, were skiing together, and at the last interchange were within 4 seconds from each other.

Qualification

Results

Semifinals

Final

References

Women's cross-country skiing at the 2022 Winter Olympics